Velagapudi Ramakrishna Siddhartha Engineering College or VRSEC is a private engineering college located in Vijayawada, Andhra Pradesh, India, that offers undergraduate education and postgraduate education in engineering. The institution is the first private institution to offer engineering education in united Andhra Pradesh and first private college to offer PG Programmes in engineering in the state in the year 1977. The college was approved to be an autonomous institution by Acharya Nagarjuna University in the year 1977.

Background 
Siddhartha Academy of General & Technical Education, better known as Siddhartha Academy, came into being in the year 1975 with a Corpus Fund of Rs.25 lakhs (Rs.2.5 million) through the efforts of 250 life members drawn from different walks of life having a philanthropic bent of mind. This was registered as a Society under the Societies Registration Act in the same year. The main objective of the academy is to establish and run educational institutions offering education at all levels in the fields of general, technical & professional education. The establishment of Siddhartha Educational Institutions followed by the establishment of other educational institutions in the last 28 years transformed this city into one of the major educational centres. As Indias second largest Railway Junction and as one of the biggest Agro Commodity Trading Centres and as the commercial hub krishna region, Vijayawada has become the second important place in the state after Visakhapatnam. Today, Siddhartha Academy is running 14 Educational Institutions, three colleges offering Intermediate(+2) and Degree (Under Graduate) courses for men and women along with a Post Graduate Centre (Graduate Programmes), two Schools one of which is fully residential, two Engineering colleges, a medical college, a college of Law, a college of Education(B.Ed), a college of Pharmaceutical Sciences and a college of Hotel Management & Catering Technology. All Siddhartha Institutions are duly approved by respective Central and State Governments and other concerned bodies.

Location 

Campus 
The college has about 5700 students, more than 350 faculty ( Faculty with 88 Ph.D.s & 100 pursuing Ph.D.s )and around 200 technical and supporting staff. Extracurricular opportunities include NCC, NSS, Students Chapters of IEEE, social clubs and sports & games.

Departments

Engineering 
 Electrical and Electronics Engineering
 Electronics and Communication Engineering
 Civil Engineering
 Computer Science & Engineering
 Information Technology
 Electronics and Instrumentation Engineering
 Mechanical Engineering

Science & humanities departments 
Chemistry Department
English Department
Mathematics Department
Physics Department

Professional departments 
Computer Applications
Business Management
Corporate Interface / T&P Cell
Library Science Department
Physical Education

Academics

The college is an autonomous college affiliated to the JNTUK, Kakinada. The college offers various UG and PG academic programs leading to the award of degrees such as B.Tech, M.Tech, MCA and MBA with English as medium of instruction. The programs are conducted on semester system and each semester provides for the minimum of 90 instructional days. The regulations in respect of the academic program of study are prepared and approved by the Academic council, the highest academic body in the college. The curriculum for the program of study is prepared by the respective board of studies and approved by the academic council. After successfully completing the program as per the relevant regulations JNUTK, Kakinada will award the degree.

TIFAC-Core 

TIFAC-CORE in Telematics is a collaborative effort of TIFAC (representing government), VR Siddhartha Engineering College and Industries in the domain of Telematics. The centre was launched on 1 February 2009.

Notable alumni 
Ram Gopal Varma, filmmaker
Lagadapati Rajagopal, industrialist and politician

References

External links 

 

1977 establishments in Andhra Pradesh
Educational institutions established in 1977
Engineering colleges in Vijayawada
Engineering colleges in Krishna district
Engineering colleges in Andhra Pradesh
Engineering universities and colleges in India